In Shinto and Buddhism in Japan, an  is a talisman made out of various materials such as paper, wood, cloth or metal.  are commonly found in both Shinto shrines and Buddhist temples and are considered to be imbued with the power of the deities or Buddhist figures revered therein. Such amulets are also called .

In a similar vein, Buddhist  are regarded as imbued with the spirit and the virtue of buddhas, bodhisattvas, or other revered figures of the Buddhist pantheon, essentially functioning in many cases as a more economic alternative to Buddhist icons and statuary.

History

The origins of Shinto and Buddhist  may be traced from both the Taoist , introduced to Japan via Onmyōdō (which adopted elements of Taoism) and woodblock prints of Buddhist texts and images produced by temples since the Nara and Heian periods. At the time, these and similar  were often employed in oath taking and contract drafting, with the terms of the oath or agreement being written on the blank side of the sheet.

The  currently found in most Shinto shrines meanwhile are modeled after the talisman issued by the Grand Shrines of Ise (Ise Jingū) called .  were originally  that wandering preachers associated with the shrines of  handed out to devotees across the country as a sign and guarantee that prayers were conducted on their behalf. These wands, called , were contained either in packets of folded paper – in which case they are called  (also ), due to the packet's shape resembling a  – or in boxes called . The widespread distribution of  first began in the Muromachi period and reached its peak in the Edo period: a document dating from 1777 (An'ei 6) indicates that eighty-nine to ninety percent of all households in the country at the time owned an Ise talisman.

It was around this time that the talisman's most widely known form – a wooden tablet containing a sliver of cedar wood known as  wrapped in paper on which is printed the shrine's name and stamped with the seals of the shrine and its high priest – developed. The Association nowadays continues to disseminate  to affiliated shrines throughout Japan, where they are made available alongside the shrines' own amulets.

Varieties and usage

 come in a variety of forms. Some shrines distribute , which consists of a sliver of wood placed inside a fold of paper.

One may also receive a wooden talisman called a  after having formal prayers or rituals performed on one's behalf in these places of worship.

Shinto  

The Association of Shinto Shrines recommends that a household own at least three kinds of : 

The  of the tutelary deity of one's place of residence
The  of a shrine one is personally devoted to 

One may own more ; these are placed on either side of or behind the aforementioned three. The manner of worship is similar to those performed in shrines: two bows, two claps, and a final bow, though a prayer – also preceded by two bows – may be recited before this.

Other  are placed in other parts of the house. For instance,  of patron deities of the hearth – Sanbō-Kōjin in Buddhism, Kamado-Mihashira-no-Kami (the 'Three Deities of the Hearth': Kagutsuchi, Okitsuhiko and Okitsuhime) in Shinto – are placed in the kitchen. In toilets, a talisman of the Buddhist wrathful deity Ucchuṣma (Ususama Myōō), who is believed to purify the unclean, may be installed.

Japanese spirituality lays great importance on purity and pristineness, especially of things related to the divine. It is customary to obtain new  before the end of the year at the earliest or during the New Year season, though (as with ) one may purchase one at other times of the year as well. (Buddhist  are however not accepted in many shrines and vice versa.)

are  made out of wood with characters carved, written, or printed directly on them.

Gallery

See also
 Ema (Shinto)
 
 Onmyōdō
 Omamori
 Onmyōji 
 Omikuji
 Netsuke
 
  (Chinese paper charm or spell)
 Thai Buddha amulet
 Holy card
 Himmelsbrief
 Murti

Notes

References

Further reading
 Nelson, Andrew N., Japanese-English Character Dictionary, Charles E. Tuttle Company: Publishers, Tokyo, 1999, 
 Masuda Koh, Kenkyusha's New Japanese-English Dictionary, Kenkyusha Limited, Tokyo, 1991,

External links

Amulets
Talismans
Shinto in Japan
Shinto religious objects
Exorcism in Shinto
Exorcism in Buddhism
Eastern esotericism
Japanese words and phrases